Lacoma is an unincorporated community in Wyoming County, West Virginia, United States.

References

Unincorporated communities in Wyoming County, West Virginia
Unincorporated communities in West Virginia